Riverside is a historic home located at Front Royal, Warren County, Virginia. It was built about 1850, and is a large -story, seven bay, "T"-shaped brick dwelling with Greek Revival, Italianate, and Colonial Revival design elements. It has a side-passage, double-pile plan with matching single-pile wings, with additions added in 1921, to the north and south. The front facade features a one-bay, hip-roofed, Greek Revival-style portico. The house has a hipped roof with dormers added in the early-20th century. Also on the property is the contributing early-20th century garage.

It was listed on the National Register of Historic Places in 1995. It is located in the Riverton Historic District.

References

Houses on the National Register of Historic Places in Virginia
Greek Revival houses in Virginia
Italianate architecture in Virginia
Colonial Revival architecture in Virginia
Houses completed in 1850
Houses in Warren County, Virginia
National Register of Historic Places in Warren County, Virginia
Front Royal, Virginia
Individually listed contributing properties to historic districts on the National Register in Virginia